The national flag of Guinea was adopted on 10 November 1958, with the publication of the country's first Constitution.

Design 
The colors of the flag were adapted from those of the Rassemblement Démocratique Africain, the dominant movement at the time of independence. The colors were in turn derived from those of the flag of Ghana, which had first adopted them in 1957. Sékou Touré, the first President of Guinea, was a close associate of Kwame Nkrumah, the former president of Ghana.

Colors 
According to Sékou Touré, first President of Guinea, the three colors of the flag represent the following: red symbolizes the blood of anti-colonialist martyrs, the labor of the working classes, and the wish for progress; yellow represents Guinean gold, as well as the sun, which is "the source of energy, generosity and equality for all men to which he gives light equally"; and green represents the country's vegetation, continued prosperity arising from its natural resources, and the historically difficult life of the Guinean masses who live in the countryside. In turn, the symbolism behind each of the three colors corresponds to the three components of the national motto: Travail, Justice, Solidarité ("Work, Justice, Solidarity").

In keeping with other flags in the region, the Pan-African movement's colors of red, yellow, and green are used.

The design is a tricolor. The colors of the flag from left to right are the reverse of the flag of Mali. The previous flag of Rwanda (in use from 1961 to 2001), the design of which was inspired by the flag of the Kingdom of Rwanda, had a large black R to distinguish it from the near-identical flag of Guinea.

Governmental flags

Historical flags

References 

Flags introduced in 1958
Flag
Flags of Africa
National flags